Yun Jeong-suk (born 11 July 1966) is a South Korean fencer. She competed in the women's team foil event at the 1988 Summer Olympics.

References

1966 births
Living people
South Korean female foil fencers
Olympic fencers of South Korea
Fencers at the 1988 Summer Olympics